Stevie Ann (born Anna Stephanie Struijk in Roggel, 24 June 1986) is a Dutch singer-songwriter.

Biography
Stevie Ann was born as Anna Stephanie Struijk in Roggel, on 24 June 1986.
She started making music at a very young age. From the first moment she learned how to play the guitar she started writing songs. In the summer of 2005 her debut album Away from Here was released. The album contains twelve tracks, all written by Ann.

The song "The Poetry Man", was released in December 2005, and gained airplay on a number of major Dutch radio stations. It is her highest charting single to date, peaking at No. 26 on the Dutch Top 40.

In her career, Ann won several awards. In November 2005, she received an Essent Award, an award for young and promising Dutch artists. In February 2006, she won a Zilveren Harp (Silver Harp). Ann was also named best new artist at the Dutch 3FM Awards.

In October 2006, Stevie Ann started a tour running until January 2007.
During November 2006 she played the opening of James Morrison's concerts in the Netherlands.

Discography

Albums
 Away From Here (2005)
 Closer to the Heart (2007)
 Light Up (2010)
 California Sounds (2013)
 Stephanie Struijk (2016)
 Fijn zo (2021)

Live-albums
 Live & Acoustic (2010)

EPs
 Changes (Klimaatwet EP) (2008)
 X-Mas (2014)

Singles
 "Away From Here" (2005)
 "The Poetry Man" (2005)
 "You Versus Me" (2006)
 "One Year of Love" (Queen cover) (2006)
 "Get Away" (2007)
 "Baby Blue" (2008)
 "You're My Best Friend" (Queen cover) (2014)

References

External links
 Stevie Ann's official website

1986 births
Living people
People from Leudal
Dutch pop singers
Dutch women singer-songwriters
21st-century Dutch women singers
21st-century Dutch singers